The Battle at Old Market Square was an anti-fascist protest on 5 June 1934 in Winnipeg, Manitoba, Canada.

Members of the Nationalist Party of Canada (NPC) planned a rally in Winnipeg's Exchange District, attended by an estimated 75 to 100 sympathizers of Adolf Hitler and Benito Mussolini. This event was "a public provocation aimed at the organized labor movement, Jews, and minority communities". This rally prompted 500 protesters from various anti-fascist groups to converge on Old Market Square; at least 20 Nationalist members were injured and seven were arrested when police arrived to subdue the crowd.

The conflict "demonstrated the successful and deeply rooted popular resistance to fascist provocations" in Winnipeg: the NPC held no further public meetings and "no fascist group in the city would ever find itself in a position to mount such public campaigns of discrimination".

References

Further reading

Events in Winnipeg
History of Winnipeg